The bronze-olive pygmy tyrant (Pseudotriccus pelzelni) is a species of bird in the family Tyrannidae. It is found in Colombia, Ecuador, Panama, and Peru. Its natural habitat is subtropical or tropical moist montane forests.

References

bronze-olive pygmy tyrant
Birds of the Northern Andes
bronze-olive pygmy tyrant
bronze-olive pygmy tyrant
Taxonomy articles created by Polbot